28 Aquilae, abbreviated 28 Aql, is a star in the equatorial constellation of Aquila. 28 Aquilae is its Flamsteed designation though it also bears the Bayer designation A Aquilae, and the variable star designation V1208 Aquilae. It has an apparent visual magnitude is 5.5, making this a faint star that requires dark suburban skies to view (according to the Bortle Dark-Sky Scale).

The spectrum of this star matches a stellar classification of F0 III.  Despite consistent spectral classifications as a giant star, models show that it is just reaching the end of its main sequence lifetime at an age of 655 million years.

The variability of 28 Aquilae was discovered by Michel Breger in 1969. It was revealed to be a Delta Scuti-type pulsating variable star with at least two periods of pulsation. The known periods have frequencies of 6.68 and 7.12 cycles per day. The outer atmosphere has an effective temperature of 7,250 K, which lies in the range of a yellow-white hued F-type star.

References

External links
 HR 7331
 CCDM 19197+1222
 28 Aquilae

Aquila (constellation)
Double stars
F-type giants
Delta Scuti variables
Aquilae, A
Aquilae, 28
181333
Aquilae, V1208
094982
7331
BD+12 3879